Varlilumab (INN; development code CDX-1127) is a monoclonal antibody designed for immunotherapy for solid tumors and hematologic malignancies. It is an anti-CD27 antibody and helps activate T-cells.

This drug was developed by Celldex Therapeutics.

It (in combination with ONT-10) has undergone a phase 1B clinical trial for advanced breast or ovarian cancer. In combination with anti-PD-1 nivolumab it has undergone a phase 1/2 trial for advanced refractory solid tumours

References 

Monoclonal antibodies